Stanley De Brath (10 October 1854 – 20 December 1937) was a British civil engineer, psychical researcher and spiritualist.

Career

Brath was born in Sydenham, Kent. He worked as a civil engineer in India for 17 years. He was most well known for his book Psychic Philosophy as the Foundation of a Religion of Natural Law, published in 1896. Alfred Russel Wallace had written an introduction for the book and considered it of "great lucidity, a philosophy of the universe and of human nature in its threefold aspect of body, soul, and spirit". The book was expanded in 1908 and endorsed by Wallace in a prefatory note.

Brath was a Christian and believed that both Christianity and spiritualism were compatible.

Brath also translated a number of psychical research books into English. He translated Charles Richet's Thirty Years of Psychical Research (1923).

He was the editor of Psychic Science a journal published by the British College of Psychic Science.

His books were criticized by the scientific community. The sociologist Guy Benton Johnson ridiculed Psychical Research, Science, and Religion in a review as an anti-scientific work and only "grand-reading if you have a sense of humor."

Publications

The Foundations of Success: A Plea for Rational Education (1896)
Psychic Philosophy as the Foundation of a Religion of Natural Law (1896, 1908) [under the pseudonym V. C. Desertis]
Mysteries of Life: A Book for Boys and Girls (1916)
Psychical Research, Science and Religion (1925)
The Drama of Europe, Or, The Soul of History (1930)
The Physical Phenomena of Spiritualism (1930)

Translations

Gustav Geley. From the Unconscious to the Conscious (1920).
Gustav Geley. Clairvoyance and Materialisation: A Record of Experiments (1927)
Charles Richet. Thirty Years of Psychical Research (1923)
Ernesto Bozzano. Animism and Spiritism: A Reply to M. Sudre's Introduction à la Métapsychique Humaine (1932)

See also
Charles Lakeman Tweedale

References

1854 births
1937 deaths
English civil engineers
Parapsychologists
English spiritualists